Neoregelia oligantha is a species of flowering plant in the genus Neoregelia. This species is endemic to Brazil.

Cultivars
 Neoregelia 'Dr. Who'

References

BSI Cultivar Registry Retrieved 11 October 2009

oligantha
Flora of Brazil